The Aubrey Watzek Library is a library on the Lewis & Clark College campus, in Portland, Oregon.

History
The building was designed by Paul Thiry and completed in 1967. The library doubled in size during renovations completed in the mid-1990s by Hoffman Construction.

In 2016, a copy of the 1599 Geneva Bible was rediscovered in the library's basement.

Special collections 
Since 2001, the library has housed the literature of the Lewis and Clark Expedition collection in a special collections facility. The William Stafford Archive was established in the special collections in 2008.

References

External links

 

1967 establishments in Oregon
Lewis & Clark College buildings
Libraries in Portland, Oregon
Library buildings completed in 1967
University and college academic libraries in the United States